A number of narrow-gauge lines survive, largely as a consequence of German reunification, in the former East Germany where some of them form part of the public transport system as active commercial carriers. Most extensive of those still employing steam traction is the Harz mountain group of metre-gauge lines, the Harzer Schmalspurbahnen. Other notable lines are the Zittau–Oybin–Jonsdorf line in Saxony, the Mollibahn and the Rügensche Kleinbahn on the Isle of Rügen on the Baltic coast and the Radebeul-Radeburg line, Weisseritztalbahn in the suburbs of Dresden. Although most rely on the tourist trade, in some areas they provide significant employment as steam traction is particularly labour-intensive.

In the Western part of Germany, Selfkantbahn (close to Heinsberg near Aachen) and Brohltalbahn (Linz/Rhine) are the best known ones, offering services in summer weekends.

Baden-Württemberg

 gauge lines
 Albbähnle Amstetten (Württemberg) – Laichingen; closed in 1985, Currently Amstetten – Oppingen is a heritage railway
 Odenwaldexpress – Mosbach–Mudau; 27,51 km, closed in 1973.
 Filderbahn; from Möhringen to Vaihingen, Hohenheim, Degerloch, and Neuhausen auf den Fildern respectively Leinfelden-Echterdingen; converted to standard gauge in 1990.
 Härtsfeldbahn – Aalen–Dillingen an der Donau; 55,49 km, closed in 1972; heritage railway on part of the line.
 Lokalbahn Rhein–Ettenheimmünster; converted to standard gauge in 1922/1927
 Mittelbadische Eisenbahnen; converted to standard gauge in 1973, now closed.
 Oberrheinische Eisenbahn – Mannheim–Heidelberg–Weinheim–Mannheim; currently operating as an electrified tram.
 Schmalspurbahn Nagold–Altensteig („Altensteigerle“); closed in 1967.
 gauge lines
 Bottwartalbahn – Heilbronn-Süd–Marbach am Neckar; 37 km, closed in 1968.
 Federseebahn Bad Schussenried – Riedlingen; 29.34 km, closed in 1964.
 Jagsttalbahn Möckmühl – Dörzbach; 39,1 km, closed in 1988 and currently reconstructed as a heritage railway
 "Öchsle" – Since 1985 a heritage railway between Warthausen and Ochsenhausen
 Zabergäubahn – Lauffen am Neckar–Leonbronn; converted to standard gauge in 1964/1965, closed in 1994.
 gauge lines
 Killesbergbahn Stuttgart; 2,3 km (miniature railway).

Bavaria
 gauge lines
 Bayerische Zugspitzbahn from Garmisch-Partenkirchen to Zugspitze; 19 km, electrified cog railway
 Chiemsee-Bahn from Prien to Prien-Stock; 1,91 km
 Kleinbahn Wallersdorf–Münchshöfen; 7,7 km, closed in 1949
 Eichstätt-Kinding Bahn; 46,4 km, converted to standard gauge in 1934
 Staatliche Waldbahn Ruhpolding–Reit im Winkl; 22,5 km, closed in 1940
 Walhallabahn from Regensburg to Donaustauf; 23,4 km, closed in 1968
 Wendelsteinbahn from Brannenburg to Wendelstein; 7,66 km, electrified cog railway
 gauge lines
 Wachtlbahn from Kiefersfelden to guesthouse Wachtl / Tirol; 6,1 km and electrified
 gauge lines
 Neuhauser Bockerlbahn; 12 km, closed in 1922
 Spiegelauer Waldbahn; 100 km, closed in 1960
 Zwieselauer Waldbahn; 14,5 km, closed in 1958

Berlin
 gauge lines
 Berliner Parkeisenbahn; 7,50 km
 Britzer Museumsbahn; 5,0 km

Brandenburg
 gauge lines
 Spreewaldbahn („Bimmelguste“) from Lübben to Cottbus via Burg (Spreewald); most lines closed until 1970, last spurs converted to standard gauge in 1983.
 gauge lines
 Jüterbog-Luckenwalder Kreiskleinbahnen (JLKB, „Märkische Bähnle“); closed in 1965
 Kleinbahnen der Kreise West- und Ostprignitz; closed until 1969, heritage railway "Pollo" relaid on a 9 km stretch.
 Kreisbahn Rathenow-Senzke-Nauen; 51,7 km, parts closed in the 1930s and in 1949, finally closed in 1961
 gauge lines
 Cottbuser Parkeisenbahn; 3,20 km, in service

Hesse
 gauge lines
 Biebertalbahn; 9,5 km, closed
 gauge lines
 Spessartbahn; 21,2 km, closed in 1951
 gauge lines
 Ernstbahn; 7,6 km, closed
 gauge lines
 Bad Orber Kleinbahn; former standard-gauge railway, partly relaid as a feldbahn to serve as a museum railway
 Frankfurter Feldbahnmuseum
 Kuhrbahn Bad Schwalbach; closed.
 gauge lines
 ; 220 m.

Lower Saxony
 gauge lines
 Inselbahn Juist; 2,8 km, from 1896 to 1982, tracks lifted.
 Inselbahn Langeoog; 2,6 km.
 Kehdinger Kreisbahn; 51,8 km, closed.
 Kleinbahn Bremen–Tarmstedt; 27,0 km, closed in 1956.
 Kleinbahn Hoya – Syke – Asendorf
 Kreisbahn Aurich; 84,6 km, closed in 1969.
 Kreisbahn Emden–Pewsum–Greetsiel; 22,8 km, closed in 1963.
 ; 3,5 km, heritage railway.
 Steinhuder Meer-Bahn StMB; 52,7 km
 Südharz-Eisenbahn Walkenried–Wieda–Braunlage–Sorge–Tanne;
 Wangerooger Inselbahn; 5,9 km.
 gauge lines
 Borkumer Kleinbahn; 7,5 km
 gauge lines
 Bleckeder Kreisbahn; 47,25 km, closed.
 Gartetalbahn Göttingen – Duderstadt; 35,6 km, closed in 1957
 Hümmlinger Kreisbahn; 28,9 km, converted to standard gauge in 1957.
 Kleinbahn Lingen–Berge–Quakenbrück; 55,3 km, closed in 1952.
 Kleinbahn Ocholt – Westerstede; 7 km, converted to standard gauge in 1904.
 Kreisbahn Cloppenburg; 29,2 km, closed in 1952.
 Kreisbahn Osterode–Kreiensen; 32,7 km, converted to standard gauge in 1967.
 gauge lines
 Inselbahn Baltrum; 0,6 km, Goods traffic from 1949 to 1985, tracks lifted.

Mecklenburg-Vorpommern

 gauge lines
 Franzburger Kreisbahnen; 67,22 km, closed in 1971
 gauge lines
 Bäderbahn Molli von Bad Doberan nach Kühlungsborn; 15,4 km
 Schmalspurbahn Neubukow Obere Weiche–Bastorf; 14,4 km, closed in 1946
 gauge lines
 Rügensche Bäderbahn („Rasender Roland“); 59,4 km, on the island of Rügen
 Demminer Bahnen; 50,9 km, closed.
 gauge lines
 Mecklenburg-Pommersche Schmalspurbahn (MPSB); closed in 1969, part revived as a heritage railway

North Rhine-Westphalia
 gauge lines
 Bielefelder Kreisbahnen; 23 km, closed in 1956
 Drachenfelsbahn, cog railway; 1,5 km
 Dürener Eisenbahn; closed in 1965.
 Euskirchener Kreisbahnen; 57 km, closed in 1959
 Herforder Kleinbahn; 40,8 km, closed in 1966.
 Hohenlimburger Kleinbahn; closed in 1983
 Iserlohner Kreisbahn; 1900–1964
 Kleinbahn Haspe–Voerde–Breckerfeld; 18,39 km, closed in 1963
 Kreis Altenaer Eisenbahn; 14,6 km, closed in 1976.
 Leppetalbahn (Engelskirchen-Marienheider Eisenbahn); 18,4 km, closed in 1958.
 Märkische Museums-Eisenbahn e. V. (MME) – Sauerländer Kleinbahn, Museumseisenbahn im Elsetal, Herscheid-Hüinghausen – Köbbinghauser-Hammer; 2,3 km
 Plettenberger Kleinbahn (Plettenberger Straßenbahn AG); closed in 1962.
 Geilenkirchener Kreisbahn – in Kreis Heinsberg, partly operating as a heritage railway, the Selfkantbahn (GKB)
 Straßenbahn Essen; 52,5 km
 Tecklenburger Nordbahn; converted to standard gauge in 1935
 gauge lines
Bröltalbahn; 87,3 km, first narrow-gauge railway in Germany.
 gauge lines
 Heisterbacher Talbahn; 7,2 km, 1891–1950
 Kleinbahn Steinhelle–Medebach; 36,3 km, closed in 1953.
 gauge lines
 Feld- und Werksbahnmuseum Oekoven in Rommerskirchen-Oekoven (Rhein-Kreis Neuss); Museumsbahn
 Dampf-Kleinbahn Mühlenstroth; 1,5 km, heritage railway

Rhineland-Palatinate
 gauge lines
 Brohltalbahn („Vulkan-Express“) – Brohl (Rhein) – Engeln; 23,83 km, heritage railway
 Rhein-Haardtbahn – Bad Dürkheim–Ludwigshafen am Rhein–Mannheim; 16,4 km, electrified
 Pfälzer Lokalbahn – Ludwigshafen – Meckenheim; closed
 Nassauische Kleinbahnen; closed
 gauge lines
 Kreuznacher Kleinbahnen; 28 km, closed in 1936.

Saxony

Saxony-Anhalt
 gauge lines
 Harzer Schmalspurbahnen, 140 km network consisting of the Selketalbahn, Harzquerbahn and the Brockenbahn, the largest narrow-gauge network in Germany
 Industriebahn Halle; closed in 1992.
 Südharz-Eisenbahn-Gesellschaft; closed in 1963

 gauge lines
 Mansfelder Bergwerksbahn; heritage railway on remaining 11.8 km

 gauge lines
 Pfännerschaftliche Kohlebahn in Halle (Saale); 5.6 km, industrial railway, closed

Schleswig-Holstein
 gauge lines
 Apenrader Kreisbahn; 86 km, closed (reunited with Denmark in 1920)
 Eckernförder Kreisbahnen; 28,7 km, closed in 1959.
 Flensburger Kreisbahn; 49,5 km, closed in 1953.
 Haderslebener Kreisbahn; 18,5 km, closed (reunited with Denmark in 1920)
 Kleinbahn Niebüll–Dagebüll; 13,7 km, opened in 1895, converted to standard gauge in 1926
 Kreisbahn auf Alsen (Danish: Amtsbanerne på Als); 19 km, converted to standard gauge in 1933 (reunited with Denmark in 1920).
 Kreisbahn Norderdithmarschen; closed in 1937
 Rendsburger Kreisbahn; 46 km, closed in 1957.
 Sylter Inselbahn, closed in 1970.

 gauge lines
 Amrumer Inselbahn; 14 km, closed in 1939.
 Halligbahn Dagebüll–Oland–Langeneß; 9 km

 gauge lines
 Halligbahn Lüttmoorsiel–Nordstrandischmoor; 3,5 km

Thuringia
 gauge lines
 Feldabahn; 27,7 km, converted to standard gauge in 1934.
 Schmalspurbahn Eisfeld–Schönbrunn (Gründerla) in the Thuringian Forest; 17,8 km, closed in 1973.
 Heldburger Bahn in Grabfeld; 29,7 km, closed in 1946.
 Gera-Meuselwitz-Wuitzer Eisenbahn; 30,1 km, closed in 1969.
 Weimar-Buttelstedt-Großrudestedter Eisenbahn; 54 km, 1946 stillgelegt
 Part of the Harzer Schmalspurbahnen at Nordhausen

 gauge lines
 Trusebahn in the Thuringian Forest (Wernshausen–Trusetal); 9 km, closed in 1966.

 gauge lines
 Parkeisenbahn Gera; 0,8 km
 Feldbahn Brotterode-Wernshausen; in use only 1896/1897, later partly replaced by Trusebahn

See also

History of rail transport in Germany
Rail transport in Germany

References

External links

 
Germany, narrow